A hemi-dodecahedron is an abstract regular polyhedron, containing half the faces of a regular dodecahedron. It can be realized as a projective polyhedron (a tessellation of the real projective plane by 6 pentagons), which can be visualized by constructing the projective plane as a hemisphere where opposite points along the boundary are connected and dividing the hemisphere into three equal parts.

It has 6 pentagonal faces, 15 edges, and 10 vertices.

Projections
It can be projected symmetrically inside of a 10-sided or 12-sided perimeter:

Petersen graph
From the point of view of graph theory this is an embedding of the Petersen graph on a real projective plane.
With this embedding, the dual graph is
K6 (the complete graph with 6 vertices) --- see hemi-icosahedron.

See also 
57-cell – an abstract regular 4-polytope constructed from 57 hemi-dodecahedra.
hemi-icosahedron
hemi-cube
hemi-octahedron

References

External links
 The hemidodecahedron

Projective polyhedra